Franklin D. Gaines (April 21, 1934–December 25, 2011) was an American politician who served in the Kansas House of Representatives and Kansas State Senate.

Gaines was elected to the Kansas House in 1966, taking office in January 1967 and serving three terms total. In 1972, he was elected to the Kansas State Senate from the 16th district, where he spent 20 years, leaving office in 1992.

Gaines worked as an attorney.

References

1934 births
2011 deaths
Democratic Party Kansas state senators
Democratic Party members of the Kansas House of Representatives
20th-century American politicians
People from Augusta, Kansas
Kansas lawyers
People from Peabody, Kansas